Idempotence is the property of certain operations in mathematics and computer science whereby they can be applied multiple times without changing the result beyond the initial application. The concept of idempotence arises in a number of places in abstract algebra (in particular, in the theory of projectors and closure operators) and functional programming (in which it is connected to the property of referential transparency).

The term was introduced by American mathematician Benjamin Peirce in 1870 in the context of elements of algebras that remain invariant when raised to a positive integer power, and literally means "(the quality of having) the same power", from  + potence (same + power).

Definition 
An element  of a set  equipped with a binary operator  is said to be idempotent under  if
 .
The binary operation  is said to be idempotent if
 .

Examples 
 In the monoid  of the natural numbers with multiplication, only 0 and 1 are idempotent.
 In the monoid  +) of the natural numbers with addition, only 0 is idempotent. Indeed, .
 In a magma , an identity element  or an absorbing element , if it exists, is idempotent.
 In a group , the identity element  is the only idempotent element.
 In a GCD domain (for instance in ), the operations of GCD and LCM are idempotent.
 In a Boolean ring, multiplication is idempotent.
 In a Tropical semiring, addition is idempotent.
 In a ring of quadratic matrices, the determinant of an idempotent matrix is either 0 or 1. If the determinant is 1, the matrix necessarily is the identity matrix.

Idempotent functions
In the monoid  of the functions from a set  to itself (see set exponentiation) with function composition , idempotent elements are the functions  such that , that is such that  (in other words, the image  of each element  is a fixed point of ). For example:
 the absolute value is idempotent.
 constant functions are idempotent;
 the identity function is idempotent;
 the floor, ceiling and fractional part functions are idempotent;
 the subgroup generated function from the power set of a group to itself is idempotent;
 the convex hull function from the power set of an affine space over the reals to itself is idempotent;
 the closure and interior functions of the power set of a topological space to itself are idempotent;
 the Kleene star and Kleene plus functions of the power set of a monoid to itself are idempotent;
 the idempotent endomorphisms of a vector space are its projections.

If the set  has  elements, we can partition it into  chosen fixed points and  non-fixed points under , and then  is the number of different idempotent functions. Hence, taking into account all possible partitions,
 
is the total number of possible idempotent functions on the set. The integer sequence of the number of idempotent functions as given by the sum above for n = 0, 1, 2, 3, 4, 5, 6, 7, 8, ... starts with 1, 1, 3, 10, 41, 196, 1057, 6322, 41393, ... .

Neither the property of being idempotent nor that of being not is preserved under function composition. As an example for the latter, the negation function  on the Boolean domain is not idempotent, but  is. Similarly, unary negation  of real numbers is not idempotent, but   is. In both cases, the composition is simply the identity function, which is idempotent.

Computer science meaning 

In computer science, the term idempotence may have a different meaning depending on the context in which it is applied:
 in imperative programming, a subroutine with side effects is idempotent if multiple calls to the subroutine have the same effect on the system state as a single call, in other words if the function from the system state space to itself associated with the subroutine is idempotent in the mathematical sense given in the definition;
 in functional programming, a pure function is idempotent if it is idempotent in the mathematical sense given in the definition.

This is a very useful property in many situations, as it means that an operation can be repeated or retried as often as necessary without causing unintended effects. With non-idempotent operations, the algorithm may have to keep track of whether the operation was already performed or not.

Computer science examples 
A function looking up a customer's name and address in a database is typically idempotent, since this will not cause the database to change. Similarly, a request for changing a customer's address to XYZ is typically idempotent, because the final address will be the same no matter how many times the request is submitted. However, a customer request for placing an order is typically not idempotent since multiple requests will lead to multiple orders being placed. A request for canceling a particular order is idempotent because no matter how many requests are made the order remains canceled.

A sequence of idempotent subroutines where at least one subroutine is different from the others, however, is not necessarily idempotent if a later subroutine in the sequence changes a value that an earlier subroutine depends on—idempotence is not closed under sequential composition. For example, suppose the initial value of a variable is 3 and there is a subroutine sequence that reads the variable, then changes it to 5, and then reads it again. Each step in the sequence is idempotent: both steps reading the variable have no side effects and the step changing the variable to 5 will always have the same effect no matter how many times it is executed. Nonetheless, executing the entire sequence once produces the output (3, 5), but executing it a second time produces the output (5, 5), so the sequence is not idempotent.
int x = 3;
void read() { printf("%d\n", x); }
void change() { x = 5; }
void sequence() { read(); change(); read(); }

int main() {
  sequence();  // prints "3\n5\n"
  sequence();  // prints "5\n5\n"
  return 0;
}

In the Hypertext Transfer Protocol (HTTP), idempotence and safety are the major attributes that separate HTTP methods. Of the major HTTP methods, GET, PUT, and DELETE should be implemented in an idempotent manner according to the standard, but POST doesn't need to be. GET retrieves the state of a resource; PUT updates the state of a resource; and DELETE deletes a resource. As in the example above, reading data usually has no side effects, so it is idempotent (in fact nullipotent). Updating and deleting a given data are each usually idempotent as long as the request uniquely identifies the resource and only that resource again in the future. PUT and DELETE with unique identifiers reduce to the simple case of assignment to a variable of either a value or the null-value, respectively, and are idempotent for the same reason; the end result is always the same as the result of the initial execution, even if the response differs.

Violation of the unique identification requirement in storage or deletion typically causes violation of idempotence.  For example, storing or deleting a given set of content without specifying a unique identifier: POST requests, which do not need to be idempotent, often do not contain unique identifiers, so the creation of the identifier is delegated to the receiving system which then creates a corresponding new record.  Similarly, PUT and DELETE requests with nonspecific criteria may result in different outcomes depending on the state of the system - for example, a request to delete the most recent record. In each case, subsequent executions will further modify the state of the system, so they are not idempotent.

In event stream processing, idempotence refers to the ability of a system to produce the same outcome, even if the same file, event or message is received more than once.

In a load–store architecture, instructions that might possibly cause a page fault are idempotent. So if a page fault occurs, the operating system can load the page from disk and then simply re-execute the faulted instruction.  In a processor where such instructions are not idempotent, dealing with page faults is much more complex.

When reformatting output, pretty-printing is expected to be idempotent. In other words, if the output is already "pretty", there should be nothing to do for the pretty-printer.

In service-oriented architecture (SOA), a multiple-step orchestration process composed entirely of idempotent steps can be replayed without side-effects if any part of that process fails.

Many operations that are idempotent often have ways to "resume" a process if it is interrupted ways that finish much faster than starting all over from the beginning. For example, resuming a file transfer, 
synchronizing files,  creating a software build, installing an application and all of its dependencies with a package manager, etc.

Applied examples 

Applied examples that many people could encounter in their day-to-day lives include elevator call buttons and crosswalk buttons. The initial activation of the button moves the system into a requesting state, until the request is satisfied. Subsequent activations of the button between the initial activation and the request being satisfied have no effect, unless the system is designed to adjust the time for satisfying the request based on the number of activations.

See also 
 Biordered set
 Closure operator
 Fixed point (mathematics)
 Idempotent of a code
 Idempotent analysis
 Idempotent matrix
 Idempotent relation a generalization of idempotence to binary relations
 Involution (mathematics)
 Iterated function
 List of matrices
 Nilpotent
 Pure function
 Referential transparency

References

Further reading 

 "idempotent" at the Free On-line Dictionary of Computing

 
 

  p. 443
 Peirce, Benjamin. Linear Associative Algebra 1870.
 

Properties of binary operations
Algebraic properties of elements
Closure operators
Mathematical relations
Theoretical computer science